St. Louis Kutis Soccer Club, better known as St. Louis Kutis, is an amateur American soccer club in St. Louis, Missouri. Founded in 1947 as the "St. Louis Raiders", the club was known as "Paul Schulte" during the 1948–49 season, "McMahon's" during the 1949–50 season and "Zenthoefer's" in the 1950–51 season. In 1953, the team was renamed "St. Louis Kutis". The club gained its greatest prominence in the 1950s when it dominated both St. Louis and national soccer competitions. In 1958, the United States Soccer Federation used Kutis, with a few guest players, as the U.S. national team in two World Cup qualifying matches.

History

St. Louis Raiders
On March 21, 1947, Gene Thumm and local businessman Nick Jost, who was inducted into the St. Louis Soccer Hall of Fame on November 11, 1976, called a meeting of soccer players and formed the Raiders club. The Raiders were established as a professional team and entered the North American Soccer Football League (NASFL) that had been established in 1946 as a professional league spanning the midwest U.S. The NASFL planned a two part season for 1947. The first half would run from April to June, the second half from September to October. The league only lasted the first half and a few games of the second half as financial difficulties led to it folding. Hall of Famer Werner Nilsen coached Raiders during 1947

With the collapse of the NASFL, Raiders became an amateur club and entered the newly established St. Louis Major League. Raiders tied St. Louis Simpkins-Ford for second in the league's standings. The team was sponsored by "Paul Schulte" for the 1948–49 season. Sponsorship was changed once again to "McMahons" for the 1949–50 season. The team regained the Raiders name briefly up to November of the 1950–51 season when Walter Zenthoefer began sponsorship of the club.  In 1951, Raiders finished third in the league.   Raiders dominated the 1952 St. Louis Major Soccer League season.  They ran to a 15–4–2 record and took the league title with a four point lead over St. Louis Simpkins-Ford.  The team also won the National Amateur Cup with a 4–3 victory over Ludlow Lusitano, but lost in the second round of the National Challenge Cup.

St. Louis Kutis
Following their victory in the National Amateur Cup, Tom Kutis of Kutis Funeral Home took over sponsorship of the team and renamed it St. Louis Kutis S.C.  Some periodicals refer to Kutis as the Undertakers but this was not a common practice.  When Kutis took on his new team, he decided to stock his team with local talent.  St. Louis had one of the richest pools of soccer talent in the U.S.  Kutis did not stop there, but also decided to sponsor three additional clubs, one adult, one for teenagers and one for boys age seven to ten.  In this way, he created a club farm system which fed players to his senior team.  On a side note, Kutis also sponsored several bowling, baseball, softball and basketball teams at the time.

Years of dominance

In its first year in existence, Kutis won the St. Louis Major Soccer League title with a 12–1–3 record. In addition, the club’s lower division team took the St. Louis Municipal League Championship title.  While Kutis entered the National Challenge Cup for the first time, it was an inauspicious start. The team defeated the Chicago Falcons 2–0.  However the Falcons managed to show that Kutis had used ineligible players. In the replay, Kutis and Chicago played first to a scoreless tie, then in the third match, Chicago overcame Kutis 2–1.  Chicago then went on to win the National Cup.

In 1954, the St. Louis Major Soccer League folded and was replaced by the St. Louis Municipal League, formerly the lower competition, as the city’s highest league.  Since Kutis had fielded a team in both leagues in 1953, the club decided to place both in the Municipal league.  The top Kutis club took the North Division title and the overall league title while the reserve team was second in the South Division.  This year, Kutis made it to the National Challenge Cup Final, before falling 1–0 and 2–0 to the professional New York Americans.  

The Municipal League folded at the end of the 1954 season, to be replaced by the Khoury League.  However, Kutis decided to withdraw his club from league play and field it as an independent team playing an exhibition schedule only.  While this schedule featured teams mainly from St. Louis and Chicago, Kutis also took on Nürnberg (a 3–2 victory).

Despite not playing in an organized league for the rest of the decade, Kutis rose to become one of the dominant teams on a national level.  They went on to win the National Amateur Cup six consecutive years (1956–1961) and were perennial contenders for the National Challenge Cup, finally winning the title in 1957.

In 1958, the success of Kutis was such that the Soccer Federation chose it to represent the U.S. in the two 1958 FIFA World Cup qualifying matches that year. In 1960, one of the Kutis club teams won the St. Louis Municipal League title. In 1963 and 1964, the Junior Team took the National Junior Cup titles.

Years of decline
Kutis continued to find success into the late 1960s, mostly in the National Amateur Cup.  However, by the late 1960s, the rise first of the National Professional Soccer League then its successor league, the North American Soccer League, saw the rapid rise in professional U.S. soccer.  By the early 1970s a local amateur club such as Kutis could no longer compete successfully.

Brief resurgence
The collapse of the NASL in the early 1980s, accompanied by the collapse of the American Soccer League, led to a brief resurgence of local and independent "super clubs" such as Kutis. This resurgence put them back into contention for the U.S. Cup in the mid and late 1980s, but as the various independent clubs began to coalesce into leagues, such as the Western Soccer League, third American Soccer League and the Lone Star Soccer Alliance, Kutis again faded from the national scene. In 2007, Kutis forfeited its Open Cup qualifying game with AAFC Elite.

Nowadays, Kutis S.C. focus on children's soccer.

Record

Coaches
 Werner Nilsen 1946–1947
 Bob Corbett 1947–1948
 Joe Carenza, Sr 1954–
 Jim Henson 1986
 Tony Glavin 1991–2000

Honors
National Challenge Cup (2): 1957, 1986
Runners-up (3): 1954, 1983, 1985
National Amateur Cup (8): 1952, 1956, 1957, 1958, 1959, 1960, 1961, 1971
Runners-up (2): 1967, 1969
 St. Louis Major Soccer League (3): 1952, 1953, 1954
Runners-up (1): 1948
 St. Louis Municipal Soccer League (1): 1960

External links

 
 History of Soccer in St. Louis
 Photos and details of the 1946–1948
 1958 Time Magazine article

Association football clubs established in 1947
K
1947 establishments in Missouri
U.S. clubs in CONCACAF Champions' Cup
U.S. Open Cup winners